Shawkat Chowdhury (born 1 August 1963) is a Bangladeshi politician and a former Jatiya Sangsad member representing the Nilphamari-4 constituency during 2014–2019.

Career
Chowdhury was elected to Parliament from Nilphamari-4 in 2014 as a candidate of the Jatiya Party in an uncontested election. In 2017, he was imprisoned for defaulting on 1.34 billion taka loan from Bangladesh Commerce Bank.

References

Living people
1963 births
Jatiya Party politicians
10th Jatiya Sangsad members
Bangladeshi politicians convicted of crimes
Prisoners and detainees of Bangladesh
Place of birth missing (living people)